Larissa is one of the regional units of Greece. It is part of the region of Thessaly. Its capital is the city of Larissa. Total population 269,151 (2021).

Geography
Larissa is the second largest regional unit in Greece, exceeded only by Aetolia-Acarnania. It covers about one-third of Thessaly. It borders the regional units of Kozani to the northwest, Pieria to the northeast, the Aegean Sea to the east, Magnesia to the southeast, Phthiotis to the south, Karditsa to the southwest and Trikala to the west.

The tallest mountain in Greece, Mount Olympus (2,917 m) is situated in the northeastern part of the regional unit. Mount Ossa is situated in the east, at the Aegean coast. The lower stretch of the river Pineios flows through the Vale of Tempe, between Olympus and Ossa.

The northern part is covered with forests, but most of the regional unit is fertile land, the Thessalian Plain.

Climate
Larissa has a mainly Mediterranean climate with hot summers and mild winters. Winter is harsher in the mountains areas, notably the north and Mount Olympus. Larissa is often the warmest area in Greece in summer and the coldest in winter. The highest temperature ever recorded was 45.4 °C (2000) and the coldest was -21.6 °C (1968). The city experiences very often temperatures over 40 °C.

Administration

The regional unit Larissa is subdivided into 7 municipalities. These are (number as in the map in the infobox):
Agia (2)
Elassona (3)
Farsala (7)
Kileler (4)
Larissa (Larisa, 1)
Tempi (5)
Tyrnavos (6)

Prefecture

Larissa was created as a prefecture in 1882. As a part of the 2011 Kallikratis government reform, the regional unit Larissa was created out of the former prefecture Larissa. The prefecture had the same territory as the present regional unit. At the same time, the municipalities were reorganised, according to the table below.

Historical Provinces
Province of Larissa (Larissa)
Province of Tyrnavos (Tyrnavos)
Province of Agia (Agia)
Province of Elassona (Elassona)
Province of Farsala (Farsala)
Note: Provinces no longer hold any legal status in Greece, they were abolished in 2006.

History

The area of Larissa was home to the Pelasgians until they merged into the broader Greek culture. The area was invaded and was ruled by the Kingdom of Macedonia a few centuries later, and was conquered by the Roman Republic after the Third Macedonian War. The Roman imperial period was followed by Byzantine rule, which was in turn succeeded by the Ottoman Empire. Parts of Thessaly revolted during the Greek War of Independence, but Thessaly remained under Ottoman Turkish rule. It was awarded to Greece in the Congress of Berlin in 1878, and finally incorporated into the Hellenic Kingdom in 1881, albeit parts of the modern Larissa prefecture, including Tyrnavos, Elassona and Sarantaporo, remained Ottoman. During the Greco-Turkish War of 1897, the area was successfully invaded by the Ottomans, but in the end Greece conceded only minor territorial losses. The northern portions of the prefecture, the Tempe Valley and Mount Olympus, were taken by Greece during the First Balkan War in 1912-1913.

The economy increased since the annexation in 1881 and later after 1913 for the north. After the Greco-Turkish War in Asia Minor of 1920-1922, refugees were relocated to the Prefecture. Several villages were created for them across the prefecture. During World War II, the area was a major scene of partisan activity. The occupation and the subsequent Greek Civil War however destroyed most of the local infrastructure. From the 1950s on, the road network was significantly expanded: the GR-1 was opened in 1957 and extended in the 1960s to the Tempe Valley. In 1984, the University of Thessaly opened its doors.

Economy

Its main economy since the 1970s are manufacturing, businesses, communications and services.  Agriculture is the second leading industry.

Agriculture

The Thessalian Plain is famous for its crops including fruits (watermelon and melon), vegetables (tomatoes, potatoes, cucumbers, onions, etc.), cotton, dairy, cattle and other crops.

Communications

Television
TRT
Thessaly

Newspapers
Agrotikoi Ekfasi - LarissaI Alitheia - FarsalaEleftheria - LarissaI Foni - FarsalaImerisios Kirykas - LarissaTa Nea tis Farsalou'' - Farsala

Transport
There are a number of highways E75 and the main railway from Athens to Thessaloniki crosses Thessaly. The region is directly linked to the rest of Europe through International Airport of Central Greece located in Nea Anchialos in a small distance from Larisa (26 kilometers).

Greek National Road 1/E75, SE, Cen., E - partially a divided superhighway
Greek National Road 3, S, Cen., NW
Central Greece Motorway - future
Greek National Road 6, W, Cen., SE
Greek National Road 13, NW
Greek National Road 26, NW
Greek National Road 30, S
Larissa-Karditsa Road, S, SW
Grevena-Elassona Road, NW
Larissa-Melivoia Road, S, E

Sports
Sporting clubs include:
 Athletic Union of Larissa 1964
Athlitiki Enosi Larissa F.C. - the only football team in Greece that ever won a championship other than the teams from Athens and Thessaloniki.
Olympia Larissa BC
AEL 1964 BC

See also
List of settlements in the Larissa regional unit

References 

 
Prefectures of Greece
Regional units of Thessaly